The SantralIstanbul, opened in 2007, is an arts and cultural complex located at the upper end of Golden Horn in the Eyüp district of Istanbul, Turkey. The center, consisting of an energy museum, an amphitheater, concert halls and a public library, is situated within the Silahtarağa campus of Istanbul Bilgi University that was formerly the first power station of the Ottoman Empire.
 
Arts, cultural, educational and social buildings of SantralIstanbul, having an area of 118,000 m2, are all housed in the facilities of the former Silahtarağa Power Station, which served from 1914 to 1983 for supplying Istanbul with electric power. The site is named after the Turkish word "santral" for power plant.

History of the power station

Redevelopment project
The redevelopment plan was initiated by Oğuz Özerden, a young businessman and founder of Istanbul Bilgi University. He succeeded to persuade Erdoğan's government, and finally obtained the rights from the Ministry of Energy and Natural Resources to establish and administer a cultural complex and its third campus on the site of the former power plant. The related protocol foreseeing the transfer for a 20-years term was signed on May 1, 2004, at the Khedive Palace in Istanbul.

A lawsuit was filed by the Chamber of Electrical Engineers' Istanbul branch, which had developed 2001 a plan with Istanbul Technical University to establish an electro-techno park. However, the Ministry of Energy preferred the project of Istanbul Bilgi University.

The project's concept is similar to the Tate Modern in London, however, it is much more comprehensive as it comprises a technology museum, an amphitheater, concert halls, a public library and residencies for visiting artists. The redevelopment project was realized in Istanbul Bilgi University's partnership with Doğuş Group, Ciner Group and Laureate Education, Inc., with the main sponsorship provided by Kale Group and the City of Istanbul. The cost of the project exceeded US$45m, exceeding the original budgeted of US$30m.

İhsan Bilgin, Dean of the School of Architecture at Istanbul Bilgi University, was responsible for the architectural coordination, while the master plan was carried out by the architects Nevzat Sayın (public library) and Emre Arolat (multi-purpose hall). Han Tümertekin joined the team for the design work on the energy museum. The architectural work was completed in three years. Some parts of the complex are still under construction.

SantralIstanbul's preliminary opening was held on July 17, 2007, with Prime Minister Erdoğan present. Three exhibitions of overseas artists were shown. Visiting hours during this period were limited between 19.00 through 23.00 hours due to ongoing construction works at the site.

The official opening took place on September 8, 2007. It is expected that around 1.5 million people will visit SantralIstanbul. Former directors were Serhan Ada and Kerim Goknel. As of 2012, the complex has been run by Istanbul Bilgi University Board.

Modern art museum
The Modern art museum, with 7,000 m2 floorspace, consists of two new buildings constructed upon the foundations of two old power plants. Only a wall and some small foundations had survived. The architects developed the new buildings based on the original dimensions of the old power plants, using old photographs showing the steam generating water-tube boiler section of the power plant.

The 5-story reinforced concrete buildings are clad in steel and glass facades. The two buildings are connected with a glass passage. The galleries are separated with mobile drywalls. The facades of the buildings are covered with aluminium mesh, which allows light to enter during the day, whilst creating a lantern-like effect at night. The building facades can also be used as a projection screen. Today, the building is no longer an art museum. It has been transformed into an educational complex filled with classrooms.

Temporary exhibitions
 "Modern Aspects" from Centre Pompidou in Paris, France (July 17, 2007–July 26, 2007) - 1st floor
 "Touch me Istanbul", digital art from ZKM in Karlsruhe, Germany (July 17, 2007–July 26, 2007) - 2nd floor
 "An Interpersonal Journey" selected videos from MUSAC in León, Spain (July 17, 2007–July 26, 2007) - 3rd floor
 "Light, Illumination , & Electricity", supported by the Anna Lindh Foundation (ALF) in collaboration with the Townhouse Gallery of Contemporary Art (Cairo, Egypt), ZINC – ECM de la Friche Belle de Mai (Marseille, France), NOMAD (Istanbul) and SCCA Ljubljana in Ljubljana, Slovenia (September 1, 2007–November 30, 2007)
 10th Istanbul Biennial, film festival (September 8, 2007–November 2, 2007)
 "Mahrem", videos, photographies, plastics and installation of 9 artists from 6 countries on women's head and body covering in Islam (October 17, 2007–November 21, 2007)
 "Modern and Beyond", 450 artworks of 100 Turkish artists from 1950 to 2000 (September 8, 2007–February 29, 2008)
 "Uncharted: User Frames in Media Arts", contemporary artworks involving the large-scale use of digital and interactive media, (21 March-16 August 2009), co-curated by Peter Weibel, Bernhard Serexhe and Atif Akin
 Kesişimler-Dönüşümler by Ahmet Güneştekin, Istanbul (March 1, 2012)

Notable contributing artists
 Shahram Entekhabi
 Shadi Ghadirian
 Ahmet Güneştekin
 Sarkis Zabunyan

Energy museum

Public library
The public library, housed in two of the former boiler houses, is scheduled to open in 2008. The facility, the biggest library in Turkey, will be able to serve around 1,000 people at the same time and open to late hours in the night every day.

Multi-purpose halls
A new building is planned for multi-purpose halls, which is still in-planning state.

Educational buildings
Four blocks of educational buildings with two or three floors are constructed in a simple structure not to outdo the functional buildings surrounding. The design is devoted to the footsteps of the old buildings, however they have large glass exteriors enabling insight.

Residents for artists
It was expected that annually around 1,000 scholarships as artists, architects, designers, philosophers, scientists and specialists for various areas of culture will stay at the residents within the complex. But today the residency program is no longer available.

Cafes and restaurant
There are three cafes in the center. A chain restaurant called "Otto Santral" turns into a discothèque in the late night hours and also hosts different events and live music. But after the new regulations on alcohol, Otto had to close down. Today the same space hosts a new restaurant called Papaz, which doesn't serve alcohol.

Admission and transport

A shuttle bus service free of charge is provided for the visitors departing from Kabatas pier, Trump Shopping Mall and the Dolapdere campus.

Address:
Eski Silahtarağa Elektrik Santrali (Former Silahtarağa Power Station)
Silahtar Mah. Kazım Karabekir Cad. 1
Eyüp-Istanbul

References

External links

SantralIstanbul official website 
Hayal Saati 
Yapı 
 
 Kamca 

Art museums and galleries in Istanbul
Turkish art
Modern art museums
Museums in Istanbul
Buildings and structures in Istanbul
Redevelopment projects in Istanbul
Buildings and structures completed in 1914
Buildings and structures completed in 2007
Golden Horn
Art museums established in 2007
Eyüp
2007 establishments in Turkey
Istanbul Bilgi University
21st-century architecture in Turkey